The 1st Composite Mounted Brigade was a formation of the British Army in World War I. It was formed by the 2nd Mounted Division during the Gallipoli Campaign on 4 September 1915 by absorbing the 1st South Midland, 2nd South Midland and 5th Mounted Brigades. The brigade was dissolved on return to Egypt in December 1915.

Formation
Due to losses during the Battle of Scimitar Hill and wastage during August 1915, the 2nd Mounted Division had to be reorganised. On 4 September 1915, the 1st Composite Mounted Brigade was formed from 1st (1st South Midland), 2nd (2nd South Midland) and 5th (Yeomanry) Mounted Brigades.  Each dismounted brigade formed a battalion sized unit:
1st South Midland Regiment (Warwickshire, Gloucestershire and Worcestershire Yeomanry)
2nd South Midland Regiment (Buckinghamshire, Dorset and Berkshire Yeomanry)
5th Yeomanry Regiment (Hertfordshire and 2nd County of London Yeomanry)
The brigade was commanded by Br-Gen E.A.Wiggin, former commander of the 1st South Midlands Mounted Brigade. The 2nd Composite Mounted Brigade was formed at the same time with the 3rd and 4th Regiments.

Dissolved
The brigade left Suvla on 31 October 1915 for Mudros. It left Mudros on 27 November, arrived Alexandria on 1 December and went to Mena Camp, Cairo.  Each regiment had left a squadron headquarters and two troops (about 100 officers and men) in Egypt to look after the horses. The 1st South Midland, 2nd South Midland and Yeomanry Mounted Brigades were reformed on 1 December and the 1st Composite Mounted Brigade passed out of existence.

See also

 1st South Midland Mounted Brigade
 2nd South Midland Mounted Brigade
 Yeomanry Mounted Brigade
 British yeomanry during the First World War

References

Bibliography
 
 

C1
Military units and formations established in 1915
Military units and formations disestablished in 1915